Pfannenstiel may refer to:

People:
Hermann Johannes Pfannenstiel (1862–1909), a German gynecologist who was a native of Berlin (see Pfannenstiel incision)
Jackalyne Pfannenstiel (born 1947), United States Assistant Secretary of the Navy (Installations and Environment)
Lutz Pfannenstiel (born 1973), retired German footballer
Max Pfannenstiel (1902–1976), German geologist
Peter Pfannenstiel (1934–2013), a German professor of medicine and thyroid expert; son of Wilhelm Pfannenstiel
Wilhelm Pfannenstiel (1890–1982), a German professor of hygiene and SS Standartenführer; son of Hermann Johannes Pfannenstiel

Other:
Pfannenstiel incision, a type of surgical incision that allows access to the abdomen
Pfannenstiel (mountain), a mountain in the canton of Zurich in Switzerland
Pfannenstiel (ship, 1998), a ship operated on Lake Zurich in Switzerland

Disambiguation pages with surname-holder lists